Medzilaborce (Midzhilabirtsyi; , Mizhlabirtsi) is a town in northeastern Slovakia close to the border with Poland, located near the towns of Sanok and Bukowsko (in southeastern Małopolska). Its population is approximately 6,500.

Characteristics
It is an administrative and cultural centre of the Laborec Region. A train line connects it with the town of Humenné to the south and with Poland to the north. The private sector and service industries are developing quickly in the town at the moment.

It is home to the Andy Warhol Museum of Modern Art, opened in 1991, which contains many artworks and effects of Andy Warhol and of his brother Paul and nephew James Warhola. Warhol's mother, Julia Warhola, was born and lived with her husband in the village of Mikó (today Miková),  to the west.

Medzilaborce is situated in one of the least developed regions of Slovakia. There are three churches in the town.

Geography
City parts:
 Medzilaborce
 Borov
 Vydraň

The town of Medzilaborce lies in the valley of the Laborec river in north-eastern Slovakia. The hills of the surrounding Laborec Highlands are typical of this countryside.

History
The oldest written record connected with Medzilaborce dates back to 1543. The village first belonged to the Drugeth family, but passed to the Csáky family in the 17th century and later in the 19th century to the Andrássy family manor. As early as the 17th century, an important trade route passed through Medzilaborce connecting the interior of Slovakia with Poland through the Lupkov Pass. Medzilaborce became a town in 1860. In 1873, construction of the train track between Homonna (present-day Humenné) and Medzilaborce and further on to Galicia via the Lupkov Pass, which contributed to the growth of the town from 724 inhabitants in 1851 to 1561 citizens in 1910. During World War I, Russian troops entered the town in February 1915 and stayed there until May 1915, leaving the town significantly damaged. In 1918 the town became part of Czechoslovakia. During the first Czechoslovak republic, there was massive unemployment, and many people emigrated from the town. The town was significantly damaged again during World War II. It was the seat of the district until 1960, when it was merged with the Humenné district. It has again been the seat of the Medzilaborce district since 1996.

Demographics
In 1910 the town had 1,561 inhabitants, 677 Ruthenian, 501 German and 255 Hungarian. More than one third of the population (34.3%) were Jewish. The town had a high percentage of Rusyns before World War II.

According to the 2001 census, the town had 6,741 inhabitants. 56.42% of inhabitants were Slovaks, 34.16% Rusyns, 6.13% Ukrainian, 1.11% Roma and 0.68% Czechs. The religious makeup was 41.15% Greek Catholics, 40.07% Orthodox, 4.94% people with no religious affiliation, 10.15% Roman Catholics and 0.33% Lutherans.

Economy and infrastructure
Glass and machinery industry have the largest tradition in town Medzilaborce.

From 1970s it had been a branch of Jablonecke sklarne which had employ approximately 600 people in the glass industry. Company has stop its operations after privatization. Glass LPS has been now a follower of  45 years old  tradition in glass industry in Medzilaborce and still manufacture crystal chandeliers and  grind crystal trimmings.

In machinery industry in Medzilaborce it was Transporta, later Vihorlat which had 1200 employees. Privatization and  crises had destroyed the whole factory. Nowadays companies Kovostroj and Labstroj continue in machinery industry.

Major employers

Glass LPS Ltd.
Kovostroj Inc.
Labstroj Ltd.

Twin towns — sister cities

Medzilaborce is twinned with:
 Náměšť nad Oslavou, Czech Republic
 Kozienice, Poland

Museum of Modern Art

Gallery

References

External links
 
 
 Unofficial website of Medzilaborce 
 Medzilaborce: Modern art in a desolate town by Chris Togneri for the Spectacular Slovakia travel guide
 Catholic church of Byzantine rite in Medzilaborce
 The Andy Warhol Museum of Modern Art - city of origin
 Andy Warhol in Slovakia by Robert Rigney

Cities and towns in Slovakia
Geography of Prešov Region
Villages and municipalities in Medzilaborce District
Rusyn communities